Dosehra is a town and union council of Charsadda District in Khyber Pakhtunkhwa province of Pakistan.
.It is located at 34°8'37N 71°54'22E and has an altitude of 258 metres (938 feet).

References

Union councils of Charsadda District
Populated places in Charsadda District, Pakistan